Jack Scott (1934–2020) was a former speedway rider from Australia.

Speedway career 
Scott was champion of Australia when he won the 1967 Australian Championship.

He rode in the top tier of British Speedway riding for the Southampton Saints from 1951-1961 and the Cradley Heathens in 1967.

References 

1934 births
2020 deaths
Australian speedway riders
Cradley Heathens riders
Plymouth Devils riders
Southampton Saints riders
Sportspeople from Adelaide